Subansiri may refer to:

 Subansiri Lower Dam, India
 Subansiri River, in India and Tibet
 Lower Subansiri district, Arunachal Pradesh, India
 Upper Subansiri district, Arunachal Pradesh, India